is a railway station in Kashihara, Nara Prefecture, Japan.

Lines
Kintetsu Railway
Minami Osaka Line

Layout
The station has two side platforms and two tracks

Adjacent stations

Railway stations in Japan opened in 1929
Railway stations in Nara Prefecture